The Kelowna Curling Club located in Kelowna, British Columbia, Canada is one of the largest and most active curling clubs in the world.

Alumni

References
http://www.kelownacurling.com/

Curling clubs in Canada
Sport in Kelowna
Curling in British Columbia
Sports_venues_in_Kelowna